The CSX Chef Menteur Pass Bridge carries one track of CSX rail lines across the Chef Menteur Pass on the eastern side of Lake Pontchartrain between New Orleans and Slidell, Louisiana.

References

Bridges in New Orleans
Swing bridges in the United States
Railroad bridges in Louisiana
CSX Transportation bridges
Slidell, Louisiana